Errol Gilmour Crossan (6 October 1930 – 23 April 2016) was a Canadian professional soccer player, active primarily in England, who played as a right winger.

Early and personal life
Crossan was born in Montreal. His family moved to the Isle of Man when he was eight, before returning to Canada in 1949, where he began his career with the Marpole Athletic Club.

Career
After making his Pacific Coast League debut with Vancouver St. Andrews FC in 1950–51, he played three seasons with New Westminster Royals from 1951–52 to 1953–54. He helped the Royals capture the 1952–53 league title and then the 1953 Canadian championship.

In 1953, he played in a North American championship match, helping the Royals win the Jack Diamond Trophy over the Chicago Falcons.

After a proposed move to England to play for Liverpool in 1953 fell through, Crossan joined Manchester City in January 1954. He later played for Gillingham, Southend United, Norwich City and Leyton Orient, scoring 57 goals in 226 games in the Football League.

Crossan played a significant role in Norwich's 1959 FA Cup run, when the team from the Third Division reached the semifinal, beating Manchester United along the way. Crossan played in all 11 ties, scoring four goals.

He later returned to Canada to play for Toronto City, before moving west to resume his career in the Pacific Coast League. After a season with the New Westminster Royals, he joined Vancouver Columbus FC. He spent the next three seasons with Columbus FC where he won his second Canadian title in 1964. He then rejoined Westminster Royals.

Crossan was inducted into the Canadian Soccer Hall of Fame in 2000 and the Norwich City Hall of Fame in 2002.

He died on 23 April 2016 in Langley, British Columbia.

Honours

Team

Westminster Royals
Canadian Championship (Challenge Trophy) winner (1953)
Pacific Coast League winner (1952–53)
Jack Diamond Trophy, North American championship (1953)

Vancouver Columbus FC
Canadian Championship (Challenge Trophy) winner (1964)

Individual
Canada Soccer Hall of Fame: 2000
Norwich City Hall of Fame: 2002
Soccer Hall of Fame of British Columbia: 2019

References

External links
 / Canada Soccer Hall of Fame

1930 births
2016 deaths
Soccer people from British Columbia
Canadian expatriate soccer players
Canada Soccer Hall of Fame inductees
Canadian soccer players
Eastern Canada Professional Soccer League players
Expatriate footballers in England
Association football wingers
Gillingham F.C. players
Leyton Orient F.C. players
Manchester City F.C. players
Norwich City F.C. players
Soccer players from Montreal
Southend United F.C. players
English Football League players
Toronto City players
Westminster Royals (soccer) players
Canadian expatriate sportspeople in England
Vancouver Columbus players